An alphabet is a standard set of letters used to write one or more languages.

Alphabet or The Alphabet may also refer to:

Language
 Alphabet (formal languages), in formal language theory, a finite sequence of members of an underlying base set
 English alphabet, a Latin alphabet consisting of 26 letters used to write the English language
 ISO basic Latin alphabet, a character-encoding standard

Art, entertainment, and media

Films
 The Alphabet (film), a 1968 short film by David Lynch
 Alphabet, a 2013 Austrian documentary by Erwin Wagenhofer

Computer games
A͈L͈P͈H͈A͈B͈E͈T͈, a 2013 game by Keita Takahashi and Adam Saltsman

Literature
 Alphabet (poetry collection), a 1981 book by Danish poet Inger Christensen
 The Alphabet, a "life work" poem by Ron Silliman, 1979–2004

Music
 "Alphabet" (Drake song), from the 2011 album Take Care
 "Alphabet" (Amanda Lear song), 1977
 Alphabet. Alphabets., a 2006 album by American experimental rock band Trophy Scars

Brands and enterprises
 Alphabet Inc., the holding company for Google and other subsidiaries
 Alphabet International GmbH., a fleet management subsidiary of the BMW Group

See also
 List of alphabets
 Alphabeta (disambiguation)
 Alphabetical (disambiguation)